Eukelade , also known as , is a retrograde irregular satellite of Jupiter. It was discovered by a team of astronomers from the University of Hawaii led by Scott S. Sheppard in 2003, and received the temporary designation .

Eukelade is about 4 kilometres in diameter, and orbits Jupiter at an average distance of 23,484,000 km in 693.02 days, at an inclination of 164° to the ecliptic (165° to Jupiter's equator), in a retrograde direction and with an eccentricity of 0.2829.

It was named in March 2005 after Eucelade - according to John Tzetzes listed by some (unnamed) Greek writers as one of the Muses.

Eukelade belongs to the Carme group, made up of irregular retrograde moons orbiting Jupiter at a distance ranging between 23 and 24 Gm and at an inclination of about 165°.

References

Carme group
Moons of Jupiter
Irregular satellites
Discoveries by Scott S. Sheppard
Astronomical objects discovered in 2003
Moons with a retrograde orbit